Handsome Siblings is a 1992 Hong Kong wuxia film adapted from Gu Long's novel Juedai Shuangjiao. The film was directed by Eric Tsang and stars Andy Lau and Brigitte Lin.

Plot
Every 18 years, the martial artists' community hold a martial arts contest to elect a new leader. Eva Palace's ruler wins the title and is tasked with eliminating the Ten Villains, who live in the Villains' Valley, a sanctuary for criminals, for stealing charity funds for victims of a flood in Eastern China. Yin Nam-tin (Eva Palace ruler's husband) believes that the villains are innocent and attempts to stop his wife from killing them. The couple turn against each other and Yin eventually manages to defeat his wife, but becomes paralyzed and mute. Eva accepts a girl called More as her disciple and raises her to disguise as a man while intending to groom her as her successor. Meanwhile, the Ten Villains accept Yin's son, Fishy, as their student and plan to "nurture" him to become the greatest villain ever and defeat Eva.

18 years later, the grown-up Fishy is sent by the Villains' Valley to participate in the Champion of the Martial World held every 18 years, as well as finding two former members of the village who stole charity funds. While he is accompanied by his surrogate parents Big Mouth Lee and Sissy To, Fish wanders off during the journey and is captured by the Black Widow into her palace, where she is served by male slaves. Shortly after, More leads an attack in the palace where she kills the Black Widow. Fishy helps Kong Yuk-long, one of the slaves, escape the palace amidst the chaos and encounters More and is enchanted by her beauty.

Fishy, Big Mouth and Sissy arrive at a gathering of the participants of the Champion of the Martial World, where Fish re-encounters More and Yuk-long while latter's father, Kong Pi-hawk and mentor Monk Blackie. Big Mouth, who thinks More is a man, decides a plan for Fishy to sodomize More to tame her reputation and kick her out of the competition before Fishy reveals her gender. They sneak into More's room and put sex-inducing powder in her wine and around her room but More finds them hiding in her drawer and attacks them, causing Big Mouth to consume some of the powder. Sissy, who was watching for them outside, leads constable Madam Ti and her team to More's room where Fishy, Sissy and Big Mouth put on an act which threatens More to reveal her true gender and take the chance to leave.

At the first round elimination competition, Fishy, More, and the Kong father and son make it to the finalists, and Monk Blackie schemes with Yuk-long to use Fishy and More to destroy Eva and help Yuk-long become the Champion of the Martial World. At night, Big Mouth and Sissy disguise as the Twin Martial Supremes and trap Fishy and More in an underground hole in order for Fishy to woo More, which succeeds as she becomes smitten with him. In the meantime, Big Mouth and Sissy encounter the real Twin Martial Supremes and mistake them for the former villains who stole the charity fund and reveals their identity and were ambushed by Pi-hawk. Fishy arrives and helps Big Mouth and Sissy escape, while More also comes to help Fishy escape, only for the latter to be caught and brought back by Eva. However, the Twin Supreme demands any personal conflicts to be resolved after the competition. Afterwards the Kongs reveal to Eva about More's affection for Fishy while secretly serving her Mad Wine, which skies deteriorates her energy and martial arts.

Fishy meets More in her room wanting to tell her the truth when he feels her love for him but is attacked by Eva, who scolds More for falling in love with a man and forces More to consume the Fatal Luosha Pill and will be only given the antidote once she defeats Fishy at the Champion of the Martial World competition the next day.

At the competition, Fishy is pitted against More and during their match, More refuses to deliver a powerful strike to Fishy so Eva steps in to attack him, but More takes the strike and Eva delivers another strike to Fishy. Monk Blackie then attacks Eva and reveals that Fishy is her son with Yin. Eva then goes insane due to remorse for hurting her son and the Mad Wine taking effect and the Kongs take the chance to kill her while Yuk-long also finds the antidote to the Fatal Luosha Pill. Fishy and More flees with Big Mouth and Sissy, while Yi-hawk is declared Champion of the Martial World when Yuk-long refuses to fight his father until the Twin Martial Supremes arrive and reveal his crimes in stealing charity funds from an account journey stolen by Yuk-long from the Black Widow's palace. Yi-hawk attacks his son for betraying him and the Twin Supreme strikes him before Yuk-long fatally destroys his father's pressure point and is declared the Champion of the Martial World. The Twin Supremes mentor Yuk-long and teacher him the Ice Cold Flaming Palm. Yuk-long masters it within couple of days and ungratefully repays his mentors by disabling their martial arts when they have used a big amount of their energies training him and have them be chased by their enemies.

Fishy marries the gravely injured More in front of his mother's spirit tablet and comatose father. The wedding is then interrupted by the Twin Supremes who are being chased by their enemies with Fishy and Big Mouth settling the dispute. The Twin Supremes then suggests and teachers Fishy to use the comatose Yin's energy to save More from succumbing to the Fatal Luosha Pill, but Yin dies after More is saved. The Twin Supremes also teach Fishy and More the Affectionate Couples' Sword to defeat Yuk-long.

Kong Yuk-long captures other members of the Ten Villains and publicly executes two of them before being interrupted by Fishy and More, who sabotages him to kill Monk Blackie. Fishy and More then leads Yuk-long to a forest a battle with help from Big Mouth and Sissy and eventually kills Yuk-long by impaling their swords at him which blows him up.

Cast
Andy Lau as Fishy
Brigitte Lin as More
Sharla Cheung as Eva Palace ruler
Ng Man-tat as Big Mouth Lee
Deanie Ip as Sissy To
Francis Ng as Kong Yuk-long
Fung Hark-On as Monk Blackie
Michael Miu as Yin Nam-tin
Anita Yuen as Madam Ti
Chang Kuo-chu as Kong Pi-hawk
Richard Ng as First Twin Villain / Supreme
Wong Ching as Second Twin Villain / Supreme
Josephine Koo as Empress / Black Widow (cameo)
Wong Yue (cameo)
Shing Fui-On as Ko Chi-sum (cameo)
Peter Chan as Crazy Lion
Lam Suet (uncredited)
Timothy Zao as Mo Tin-chong (uncredited)
Shut Mei-yee
Mai Kei
Chan Chi-fai
Hon San
Angela Fong
Chow Hong-chiu
Ah King
Jameson Lam (uncredited)
Chang Kin-ming (uncredited)
Leung Kai-chi

Music

Theme song
Cynicism (玩世不恭)
Composer: Lowell Lo
Lyricist: Susan Tong
Singer: Andy Lau

Sub-theme song
On the Eve Before the Battle (決戰前夕)
Composer: Joseph Koo
Lyricist: Susan Tong
Singer: Andy Lau

Accolades

References

External links

1992 films
1992 martial arts films
1992 action films
Hong Kong action films
Hong Kong martial arts films
Wuxia films
Kung fu films
1990s Cantonese-language films
Works based on Juedai Shuangjiao
Films based on works by Gu Long
Films directed by Eric Tsang
1990s Hong Kong films